The Church of St. Nicholas (is a Serbian Orthodox church built in the mid-16th century, located in Gotovuša, Kosovo. It lies by the village graveyard.

See also
Cultural monuments of the Kosovo district

References

Sources
SANU, National Center for Digitization, Cultural Monuments in Serbia: Crkva Sv. Nikole

HISTORIC MONUMENTS OF KOSOVO AND METOHIJA, AUTONOMOUS PROVINCE OF REPUBLIC OF SERBIA (DISTRICTS: PEC, PRIZREN AND PRISTINA), #10

Štrpce
16th-century Serbian Orthodox church buildings
Serbian Orthodox church buildings in Kosovo
Cultural heritage of Kosovo